Tobias Stephan (born 21 January 1984) is a Swiss former professional ice hockey goaltender who predominately played in the Swiss National League (NL). He also played in the National Hockey League (NHL) for the Dallas Stars.

Playing career
Stephan was born in Zürich, Switzerland. As a youth, he played in the 1997 and 1998 Quebec International Pee-Wee Hockey Tournaments with a team from Zürich.

In 2001, he was named the best goaltender at U18 World Junior Championships. Stephan first played for EHC Chur and then for the Kloten Flyers in Switzerland. In 2002, he was named the best rookie in the Swiss Hockey League.

Stephan was drafted 34th overall in the second round of the 2002 NHL Entry Draft by the Dallas Stars, and is the third highest Swiss drafted in history. He is the fourth Swiss goalie who has been drafted by an NHL team after Pauli Jaks, David Aebischer and Martin Gerber.

Stephan made his first career NHL start on 13 October 2007 against the Chicago Blackhawks, since both of the Stars' goaltenders — Marty Turco and Mike Smith — were injured. Until the Blackhawks tied the game with two seconds remaining in regulation, Stephan had saved all 39 shots and was looking forward to a shutout in his first game. However, the Blackhawks scored again on their first shot in overtime and won the game 2–1. He would go back to the AHL after the game .  Before the 08/09 season started, he would learn that he will be backing up Marty Turco. His first win was on 29 October against the Minnesota Wild — the Stars won 4–2. Stephan left the Stars on 31 July 2009 to sign for Genève-Servette in Switzerland.

At the conclusion of the 2018–19 season, Stephan joined Lausanne HC on a three-year deal worth CHF 3 million.

On 6 February 2023, during his fourth year with Lausanne HC, Stephan announced he would retire from professional hockey at the conclusion of the 2022–23 season, following 22 professional seasons.

References

External links 
 
 Statistics and Biography

1984 births
Living people
Dallas Stars draft picks
Dallas Stars players
Genève-Servette HC players
Ice hockey players at the 2010 Winter Olympics
Ice hockey players at the 2014 Winter Olympics
Ice hockey players at the 2018 Winter Olympics
Iowa Stars players
EHC Kloten players
Lausanne HC players
Olympic ice hockey players of Switzerland
Ice hockey people from Zürich
Swiss ice hockey goaltenders
EV Zug players